Melicope hawaiensis, or manena, is a species of flowering plant in the family Rutaceae, that is endemic to the Hawaiian Islands.  It is threatened by habitat loss.

References

hawaiensis
Endemic flora of Hawaii
Biota of Hawaii (island)
Biota of Lanai
Biota of Maui
Biota of Molokai
Taxonomy articles created by Polbot